Mogens Skeel (1651-1694) was a Danish playwright. He wrote the play Grevens og Friherrens Komedie in 1675.

Danish dramatists and playwrights
1651 births
1694 deaths
Danish male dramatists and playwrights
17th-century Danish writers
17th-century male writers
Skeel family